Penceilogi is a small village on the northern outskirts of Llanelli, Carmarthenshire, Wales.  It is bordered by Bryn to the east, Dafen to the north-west, Pemberton to the west and Cwmcarnhywel to the south.

Llanelli Rural